Sophie Vavasseur (born 10 May 1992) is an Irish actress best known for her award-nominated role as Evelyn Doyle in the Irish film Evelyn.

Career 
Born in Dublin, Ireland, the fourth child of plumber Christopher Vavasseur, who died when she was 16, and Adrienne, Vavasseur has appeared in films and on stage, and has done a number of advertisements and voice-overs. She has acted in several films to date. The first was Evelyn, in which she played the title role, (the daughter of Pierce Brosnan's character). The second was Resident Evil: Apocalypse where she played Angela "Angie" Ashford, the daughter of T-virus creator Charles Ashford. Film credits also include the IMAX film Country Music: The Spirit of America. On stage she appeared in Come on Over by Conor McPherson at the Gate Theatre.

In 2007, Vavasseur appeared in Becoming Jane, a movie based on the private life of Jane Austen; that same year she starred in a British television adaptation of Charles Dickens's The Old Curiosity Shop. In 2010, she appeared as a possessed teenager in the Spanish horror film Exorcismus, alongside Richard Felix, Doug Bradley and Stephen Billington.

Filmography

Film

Television

References

External links

Irish television actresses
Irish child actresses
Irish film actresses
Actresses from Dublin (city)
1992 births
Living people